Xidda is a town in the Bari region of Puntland in northeastern Somalia. Xidda lies on the main road between Bosaso and Galkacyo.

External links
Xidda, Somalia

References

Populated places in Somalia
Bari, Somalia